is the first in a series of children's books authored by Yūichi Kimura and illustrated by Hiroshi Abe. In 1995, the book won the 26th Kōdansha Literature Culture Award and the 42nd Sankei Children's Literature Culture Award.

As the series became more popular, a compilation called  was released in 2004 and a movie adaptation was produced. Soon after, Kimura wrote the seventh and last book, .

Arashi no Yoru ni was published in Japanese textbooks by Mitsumura Tosho Publishing. In 2005, Gisaburō Sugii directed an animated film adaptation covering all seven books in the series. A CG-animated anime television series by Sparky Animation, began airing in Japan from April 4, 2012 to September 26, 2012.

Plot
A goat named Mei wanders into a barn one night, seeking shelter from a storm. In the barn, the goat meets another refugee. The two can neither see nor smell each other, but nevertheless they huddle together, fending off the cold, and begin to talk. Eventually, they establish a friendship. The two decide to meet later and will recognize each other by using the password "one stormy night". The next day, when they meet, Mei learns that his companion from the night before was a wolf named Gabu. Despite their natural predisposition as enemies, they share a common bond and begin meeting regularly. However, Mei's labor and Gabu's pack eventually find out about their relationship and forbid the friendship. In a truly underhanded tactic, the pack and labor attempt to force Mei and Gabu to use each other to get information on their enemies. Mei and Gabu, no longer wanting to be bound by their respective clan's unjust regulations and hoping to preserve their friendship, cross a river during a storm. They hope to find an "emerald forest" free from persecution.

However, Giro, the leader of Gabu's pack, holds a grudge against goats and views Gabu as a traitor to all wolves. Giro and his pack begin to hunt down the two companions. Gabu and Mei reach the summit of a mountain where they stop and rest, exhausted from fighting their way through a snowstorm. Mei, knowing that Gabu has not eaten in days, offers to sacrifice himself as sustenance. Gabu reluctantly agrees initially, but soon realizes that no matter how hungry he is, he cannot eat his friend. Gabu hears his pack approaching and leaves Mei to face them, ready to defend his goat friend to the death. As Gabu is about to go face the wolf pack, there is an avalanche that sweeps them all away. The next morning, Mei digs through the snow blocking the cave and sees the "emerald forest" they had been searching for in the distance. Gabu is missing, but Mei finds him in another cave. Mei finds that Gabu has lost his memory of their friendship and all the events that preceded the avalanche due to the trauma of surviving that disaster, and Mei knows not how to undo the damage. While waiting for the moon to come out, Gabu taunts Mei that he plans on eating him. Mei, saying that he wouldn't have minded being eaten by Gabu before, accuses the wolf of not being the Gabu he previously knew and deems him pathetic for not even attempting to remember his past. Disappointed and disillusioned, Mei shouts that had he known things would take this turn it would have been better if they had never met each other on "one stormy night". On hearing these words, Gabu's memory slowly returns in flashes before in a rapid burst. After regaining himself, Gabu turns to Mei and speaks his name as well as wondering why they are in the cave; having no recollection of his time while amnesiac. A stunned and overjoyed Mei, deciding it would not matter to tell Gabu about his amnesia, claims to have been waiting for Gabu this whole time and they happily reunite. In the end, Mei and Gabu both enjoy watching the moon as it rises, marveling at its beauty and swearing that their friendship will last forever no matter what. Giro and the wolf pack are shown to have survived the avalanche and are seen running away back to their home gorge.

Book series
The picture book series, published by Kodansha, Ltd., has been released in Japanese in seven volumes.

 (1994) 
 (1996) 
 (1997) 
 (1999) 
 (2000) 
 (2002) 
 (2005)

Characters
, a wolf from the Bakubaku Valley.
, a goat from the Sawasawa Mountains. While the gender is unmentioned in the original books, Mei is depicted as a male goat in the film and a female goat in the TV series.
, the boss of the Bakubaku Valley wolves and a friend of Gabu's father.
, a red-haired wolf and Giro's right-hand man.
, an overweight goat who acts as an elder brother figure to Mei.
, a pink-colored goat and a friend of Mei. She does not appear in the book series.
, the leader of the goats of the Sawasawa Mountains.
, who attempted to save Mei from a group of wolves when he was a child, managing to bite off Giro's ear before being eaten. Though she is mentioned, she does not physically appear in the book series.
, who raised Mei after his mother was killed, and is later shocked when Mei befriends Gabu. She does not appear in the book series.
, she is mentioned.

Stage
Since 1997, Engekishūdan En has annually performed the story on the "En Kodomo Stage." Performers have included Yoshie Minami, Akio Kaneda, Rintarō Nishi, and Rieko Takahashi among others.

In 2004, Aoni Production sponsored the Voice Fair 2004's dramatization of Arashi no Yoru ni and Aru Hareta Hi ni, which starred Katsue Miwa as Mei and Minori Matsushima as Gabu.

In 2007, Yoshikazu Yokoyama directed the Engekishūdan Studio Life musical version, in which Sayaka Yoshino portrayed Mei.

Media

Animated film
The film Arashi no Yoru Ni, directed by Gisaburō Sugii and animated by Group TAC, was released in Japan on December 10, 2005. The film stayed on the top 10 list for the Japanese box office for well over a month, with over 1,200,000 viewers in the first month alone. On January 20, 2006, "Arashi no Yoru Ni" was screened in Taiwan. Altogether, the film grossed over ¥1.8 billion. The Japanese DVD was released on June 23, 2006 as both a special edition and a standard edition. In 2007, the film was nominated for the Japan Academy Prize for Animation of the Year.

A small group of voice actors and sound engineers acquired permission from the original producers Tokyo Broadcasting System Television (TBS) to make a complete English dub of the Arashi no Yoru Ni movie for YouTube. The first part of the movie was uploaded on December 31, 2008 and was completed on November 5, 2009. On December 23, 2009 the team released an AC3 file which replaces the Japanese voice cast with an English voice cast. The team was unable to obtain the rights to the song Star by Aiko, the original theme song for the movie. The ending was replaced with the song "Watch the Moon Rise" written and performed by Tustin Gilmer Macafee under the name MFE. The vast majority of the voice acting is also done by Tustin Gilmer Macafee, with him and the rest of the cast being under pseudonyms for privacy reasons.

Credits

Other cast (English dub): Jarett Mauss, Luis Dirk Vardaman, Tustin Gilmer Macafee, Shanaa Moreau

Staff
 Original story: Yuuichi Kimura
 Director: Gisaburou Sugii
 Animation supervisor: Tsuneo Maeda
 Character design: Marisuke Eguchi
 Art director: Yukio Abe
 Music: Keisuke Shinohara
 Theme song: "Star" by Aiko

Drama CD
Sound Theater: Arashi no Yoru ni was released on December 22, 2006.

Anime television series
A CG-animated television series, has been produced by Sparky Animation in co-operation with Duckbill Entertainment, Baku Enterprise and Bandai Visual and began airing in Japan on TV Tokyo from April 4, 2012 with both Japanese and English audio tracks. The opening theme is "Friendship Birthday" by Sea☆A whilst the ending theme is "Dear My Friend" by U-KISS.
This animation is a co-production between Japan and Singapore.
The animation has been conceived in Japan, then rewritten and adapted to English with pre-recorded voices. Afterwards, it was dubbed into Japanese.
In contrast to the original books, where Mei was never given a specific gender and the feature movie which had Mei as a male goat, the television series casts Mei as female.

Episode list

Credits

In addition to occasional name changes: Mei, Giro, and Zack have the spelling of their names changed to May, Ghiro, and Zak, respectively.

Staff 

 Director: Tetsurou Amino

Staff (English version)

 Producer: Jim Weatherford
 Director: Gerri Sorrells
 Writer: Gerri Sorrells

References

Most of the content of this article comes from the equivalent Japanese-language Wikipedia article.

External links

 
"Arashi no Yoru Ni" movie official website 
Anime series official website 
Yūichi Kimura's home page 
TBS's "Stormy Night" website in English 

1994 Japanese novels
LGBT-related children's novels
Fiction about goats
Novels about wolves
Novels about friendship
Bandai Visual
2012 anime television series debuts
Japanese children's animated fantasy television series
Japanese LGBT-related animated television series
LGBT in anime and manga
Japanese-language television shows
TV Tokyo original programming
Television shows based on Japanese novels
Television series about wolves
Group TAC